Greene County Courthouse is a historic courthouse building located at Snow Hill, Greene County, North Carolina.  It was built in 1935, and is a two-story, conservative Classical Revival style brick building.  The front facade features a Doric order pedimented portico.  The building was constructed under the Works Project Administration.

It was listed on the National Register of Historic Places in 1979.  It is located in the Snow Hill Historic District.

References

Works Progress Administration in North Carolina
County courthouses in North Carolina
Courthouses on the National Register of Historic Places in North Carolina
Neoclassical architecture in North Carolina
Government buildings completed in 1935
Buildings and structures in Greene County, North Carolina
National Register of Historic Places in Greene County, North Carolina
Historic district contributing properties in North Carolina